This is a list of player movements for Super Rugby teams prior to the end of the 2021 Super Rugby season. Departure and arrivals of all players that were included in a Super Rugby squad for 2020 or 2021 are listed here, regardless of when it occurred. Future-dated transfers are only included if confirmed by the player or his agent, his former team or his new team.

Notes
 2020 players listed are all players that were named in the initial senior squad, or subsequently included in a 23-man match day squad at any game during the season.
 (did not play) denotes that a player did not play at all during one of the two seasons due to injury or non-selection. These players are included to indicate they were contracted to the team. For the 2020 season, Super Rugby was suspended after 7 rounds of matches due to the COVID-19 pandemic, with regional tournaments taking place there after. Players listed as 'did not play' did not feature in any of the 7 rounds of matches played that season.
 (short-term) denotes that a player wasn't initially contracted, but came in during the season. This could either be a club rugby player coming in as injury cover, or a player whose contract had expired at another team (typically in the northern hemisphere).
 Flags are only shown for players moving to or from another country.
 Players may play in several positions, but are listed in only one.

Bulls

In September 2020, SA Rugby confirmed that all South African sides would withdraw from Super Rugby, and look to join an expanded version of the Pro14. All players listed remained contracted to the Bulls for the Pro14 Rainbow Cup SA unless stated.

Lions

In September 2020, SA Rugby confirmed that all South African sides would withdraw from Super Rugby, and look to join an expanded version of the Pro14. All players listed remained contracted to the Lions for the Pro14 Rainbow Cup SA unless stated.

Sharks

In September 2020, SA Rugby confirmed that all South African sides would withdraw from Super Rugby, and look to join an expanded version of the Pro14. All players listed remained contracted to the Sharks for the Pro14 Rainbow Cup SA unless stated.

Stormers

In September 2020, SA Rugby confirmed that all South African sides would withdraw from Super Rugby, and look to join an expanded version of the Pro14. All players listed remained contracted to the Stormers for the Pro14 Rainbow Cup SA unless stated.

See also

 List of 2020–21 Premiership Rugby transfers
 List of 2020–21 Pro14 transfers
 List of 2020–21 Top 14 transfers
 List of 2020–21 RFU Championship transfers
 List of 2020–21 Major League Rugby transfers
 SANZAAR
 Super Rugby franchise areas

References

2020
2020 Super Rugby season
2021 Super Rugby season